A general election was held in the U.S. state of Michigan on November 8, 2016.

There were voting machine failures on election day.

State elections

Michigan House of Representatives

Supreme Court

Associate Justice (Full term)

Candidates
Doug Dern (Natural Law)
Frank S. Szymanski (Democratic), judge of the Wayne County Probate Court
David Viviano (Republican), incumbent Associate Justice of the Supreme Court of Michigan

Results

Associate Justice (Term ending 01/01/2019)

Candidates
Joan Larsen (Republican), incumbent Associate Justice of the Supreme Court of Michigan
Kerry L. Morgan (Libertarian), counsel at Pentiuk, Couvreur & Kobiljak, P.C.
Deborah Thomas (Democratic), judge of the Third Judicial Circuit Court of Michigan

Results

Federal elections

President and vice president of the United States

United States House of Representatives

References

 
Michigan
Michigan elections by year